Cover Your Tracks was an American metalcore band from Atlanta, Georgia.

Band members
Paul Rose - lead vocals
Omar Magana - guitar
Cory Ferris - bass
Brent Guitswite - drums
Ian Marchionda - guitar / backing vocals

Albums
Fever Dream (2016)

Singles

Music videos

References 

Metalcore musical groups from Georgia (U.S. state)
Musical groups established in 2014
2014 establishments in Georgia (U.S. state)
Musical groups from Atlanta